Bozorg Bisheh-ye Mahalleh (also Romanized as Bozorg Bīsheh-ye Maḩalleh; also known as Bozorg Bīsheh) is a village in Emamzadeh Abdollah Rural District, Dehferi District, Fereydunkenar County, Mazandaran Province, Iran. At the 2006 census, its population was 1,292, in 294 families.

References 

Populated places in Fereydunkenar County